Qingyuan Maglev is a medium-low speed maglev line under construction in Qingyuan, Guangdong province, China.

The line will operate at speeds up to 120 km/h. The first phase is 8.1 km with 3 stations and a site reserved for a fourth station. The first phase will connect the Yinzhan railway station on Guangzhou–Qingyuan intercity railway with the Qingyuan Chimelong Theme Park. In long-term the line will be 38.5 km.

Stations

History 
On October 13, 2019, general manager Xie Hailin and Yan Juping, deputy general manager and chief engineer of the company visited Qingyuan maglev general contracting project for on-site investigation and held a project site promotion meeting.

References

External links

Maglev
Rapid transit in China
Rail transport in Guangdong
Transport infrastructure under construction in China